A special election was held in  on May 17, 1825 to fill a vacancy caused by the resignation of Joel R. Poinsett (J) on March 7, 1825 to become Minister to Mexico.

Election results

Drayton took his seat on December 5, 1825

See also
List of special elections to the United States House of Representatives
 1824 and 1825 United States House of Representatives elections

References

South Carolina 1825 01
South Carolina 1825 01
1825 01
South Carolina 01
United States House of Representatives 01
United States House of Representatives 1825 01